Chad Van De Keere is a Canadian animation director who currently resides in Vancouver, British Columbia, Canada. He is known for directing animated television series as well as animated films primarily targeted for children and families. He has worked in animation since 1994. Started in animation as an animator and layout artist. He has worked in several creative positions throughout his career, such as special effects animator, designer as well as an editor before he became a director.

Filmography

Director

Movies 

 Abominable Christmas
 Being Ian: An IanConvenient Truth
 Dear Dracula

Series 

 1001 Nights
 Being Ian
 SuperKitties

Episodic 

 Planet Sheen

Assistant director

Series 

 Teenage Mutant Ninja Turtles (2012 TV series)

Awards and nominations

Trivia 
Chad has been a certified PADI rescue diver and open water instructor since 1991.

References

External links 
 
 
 

1971 births
Canadian television directors
Film directors from Vancouver
Living people
Place of birth missing (living people)